Usman Mukhtar (born 27 July 1985) is a Pakistani  actor, director, producer and cinematographer.

Personal life
Mukhtar was born in Rawalpindi on 27 July 1985, to actress Nasira, who has acted in 158 films and was known for her roles as a villain, while his grandfather was a lawyer. 

Because his family did not support his desires to become a movie director, he studied journalism instead of going to film school. 

At one point, he also wanted to become a professional cricketer, but there too his family dissuaded him.

Mukhtar married Zunaira Inam Khan in an intimate Nikkah ceremony in April 2021.

Career
Mukhtar began his career as a filmmaker in 2006 and as a theatre actor in 2007, directing music videos and short films as well as acting in many plays before getting his break as a film actor with a role in the 2016 film Janaan. He then had a role in the 2018 film Parchi, a movie for which he was also the cinematographer.

In 2019, Mukhtar starred in the Hum TV drama Anaa, written by Samira Fazal and directed by Shahzad Kashmiri, which marked his acting debut on television.

In 2020, Mukhtar hosted the Hum Style Awards. He played the role of "Dr Haris" in another Hum TV drama called Sabaat.

An upcoming sci-fi movie of Mukhtar is expected, which is based on the 80's & 90's very popular superhero Umro Ayyar. The film Umro Ayyar - A New Beginning title released in Nov 2021.

In April 2022, he became a producer after launching Eastern Terrestrial (ET) Studios with actor Meiraj Haq, the production house aiming to discover and help new talents.

In June 2022, he released Gulabo Rani, an horror short film that was well received, winning the Best Short Film Award at the 2022 Los Angeles Sci-Fi & Horror Festival.

Filmography

Short films

Films

Television

Awards and nominations

References

External links 

Living people
1985 births
Pakistani music video directors
Pakistani cinematographers
Pakistani male stage actors
Pakistani male film actors
Pakistani male television actors
Male actors from Rawalpindi
Pakistani film producers
Punjabi people